The Temple of Israel is a Jewish house of prayer located on the corner of Fourth and Market Streets in Wilmington, North Carolina, United States. Built in 1876, the Temple of Israel is the oldest synagogue in North Carolina and one of the earliest Reform synagogues in the American South. Temple of Israel is led by Rabbi Emily Losben-Ostrov.

History
Sephardic Jews first arrived in North Carolina during the early 18th century. By 1852, a Jewish Burial Society was formed in Wilmington with a Hebrew cemetery opening in 1855. An Orthodox Jewish congregation was formed in 1867, but did not succeed. In 1872, a Reform congregation was started by German Jews and their synagogue, the Temple of Israel, was dedicated on May 12, 1876.

Princeton All American football player and World War I hero Arthur Bluethenthal was a member of the synagogue.

Architecture
The Temple of Israel's architecture is a combination of Greek Revival and Moorish styles. The Moorish architecture is unique in the city of Wilmington, but was common during late 19th century for many American synagogues. The synagogue features horseshoe arches and twin towers topped with golden onion domes. The building's exterior was restored in 1982, 2000 and 2013.  It is a contributing building in the Wilmington Historic District.

Notable members

Arthur Bluethenthal (1891–1918), college football player and World War I pilot

References

External links
 

1872 establishments in North Carolina
Buildings and structures in Wilmington, North Carolina
German-American culture in North Carolina
German-Jewish culture in the United States
Gothic Revival architecture in North Carolina
Gothic Revival synagogues
Greek Revival architecture in North Carolina
Greek Revival synagogues
Reform synagogues in North Carolina
Synagogues completed in 1876
Religious organizations established in 1872
Moorish Revival architecture in North Carolina
Moorish Revival synagogues